Steve Jolley (born October 15, 1975) is a retired American soccer defender, who spent ten seasons in Major League Soccer and one in the Premier Development League. Today, Jolley provides color commentary for the New York Red Bull’s games on Red Bulls Radio. Additionally, he works for a very successful wealth management firm, Walsh & Nicholson Financial Group.

Career
Jolley led Kempsville High School to back-to-back Virginia state championships. After playing college soccer at College of William and Mary, Jolley was drafted by the Los Angeles Galaxy with the ninth overall pick of the 1997 MLS College Draft. He spent the next three years in Los Angeles, switching from the midfield into defense as time went on. The lowlight of his Galaxy career came in the 1999 MLS Cup, when Jolley had to come into the game just nine minutes from the start for the injured Robin Fraser. Jolley scored four goals during his time with the Galaxy.

He was traded to the MetroStars for a second-round draft pick after playing just four minutes for the Galaxy in 2000. He combined with Mike Petke and Daniel Hernández on an excellent three-man backline that helped the Metros rise in the MLS standings. Jolley would play every possible Metro minute of the 2000 and 2001 seasons. He finished his Metro career in 2003 with 104 league games and 129 in all competitions (both numbers third in team history), seven goals (eight in all competitions) and six assists. He also became prominent in the community and earned MLS Humanitarian of the Year honors in 2002 in part for his effort for 9/11 related charities.

Jolley was traded to the then-Dallas Burn before the 2004 season for Tenywa Bonseu. He became a regular for Dallas, scoring one goal and starting almost every game, but also had a dubious distinction of scoring two own goals in one game (for Jolley, only one of those was attributed to him). After losing his starting job with the club in 2005, he was traded back to the MetroStars before the 2006 season.  At the end of the year, he was waived by the team, which had become known as New York Red Bulls.

After a brief retirement from soccer, he returned in 2007 to play for the Long Island Rough Riders in the Premier Development League.

Jolley now works as an analyst on Red Bulls radio broadcasts.

References

External links
No more bleeding: Steve Jolley retires
 

1975 births
Living people
American soccer players
LA Galaxy players
New York Red Bulls players
FC Dallas players
Long Island Rough Riders players
William & Mary Tribe men's soccer players
USL League Two players
Major League Soccer players
Major League Soccer All-Stars
Soccer players from Virginia
LA Galaxy draft picks
Association football defenders